Pechersky Ascension Monastery (Pechyorsky Vozensensky Monastyr) is a monastery in Nizhny Novgorod, Russia. It is the principal monastery of the Nizhny Novgorod Eparchy (diocese) and the seat of the Bishop of Nizhny Novgorod and Arzamas.

History 
Pechersky Voznesensky Monastery is usually said to have
been founded ca. 1328-1330 by St. Dionysius, who came to Nizhny Novgorod from Kiev Pechersk Lavra (i.e., Kiev Monastery of the Caves, pechery meaning 'caves') with several other monks, and dug for himself a cave on the step Volga shore some 3 km southeast of the city. Later on, he founded at that site a monastery with a church of Resurrection of the Lord.

The monastery soon became an important spiritual and religious center of the Principality of Suzdal and Nizhny Novgorod.

The monastery was destroyed by a landslide on June 18, 1597; surprisingly, no one died. The same year the monastery was rebuilt about 1 km upstream (north) of the old site.

Although there are no caves in the modern monastery, the appellation Pechersky, linking it to the old Kiev cloister, has been preserved. Moreover, the entire section of Nizhny Novgorod surrounding the monastery, occupying the uplands above the Volga south of the city center, is known as Pechery.

The monastery was closed by the NKVD in 1924, and reopened in 1994.

Principal buildings 

The principal buildings of the monastery include:
 Ascension Cathedral (Вознесенский собор), constructed in 1630—1632.
 The Church of Dormition of Our Lady (Успенская церковь), 1648.
 The Church of Saint Venerable Euthimios of Suzdal, built over the monastery's inner gate (Надвратная церковь во имя св. преп. Евфимия Суздальского), 1645.
 The Church of SS Peter and Paul (Церковь во имя св. апостолов Петра и Павла), 1738.
 Bishop's residence (архиерейские палаты), 1632.
 Hegumen's building (игуменский корпус), 1765. 
 Monks' residence (братский корпус), 17th century.

The belfry of the Ascension Cathedral (which also serves as a clock tower) is noticeably out of plumb. It has been leaning almost since the time it was originally constructed.

The monastery is surrounded by a red brick wall with small towers, making it look like a small kremlin.

The diocesan archeological museum and a book and icon shop operate in the monastery. In the latter, one can request a variety of prayers for the living and dead, in accordance with the posted fee list.

Holy relics
 In 2006-2007, the monastery housed an important relic known as the Honorable Head (i.e., skull) of the Venerable Macarius. It was solemnly transferred to Makaryev Monastery in 2007.

External links

 
 An extract from a 19th century Nizhny Novgorod guide book
 Frescos of the refectory of the Ascension Cathedral in Nizhny Novgorod's Pechersky Ascension Monastery

Churches in Nizhny Novgorod
Museums in Nizhny Novgorod
Religious museums in Russia
Russian Orthodox monasteries in Russia
Cultural heritage monuments of federal significance in Nizhny Novgorod Oblast